The VLF transmitter DHO38 is a VLF transmitter used by the German Navy near Rhauderfehn, Saterland, Germany. It is used to transmit coded orders to submarines of the German Navy and navies of other NATO countries.

DHO38 has transmitted since 1982 on 23.4 kHz with a power of up to 800 kilowatts. DHO38 uses an umbrella antenna which is carried from 8 steel tube masts with a height of 352.8 metres. Each pylon stands on 3 metre tall ceramic cylinders, which serve as insulators for voltages up to 300 kV. The masts are equipped with cylindrical oscillation dampers for better protection against storms. The transmitter is capable of transmitting signals to submarines worldwide to depths of approx. 30 metres.

External links
 
 http://skyscraperpage.com/diagrams/?b45289

Radio masts and towers in Germany
Military radio systems
1982 establishments in West Germany
Towers completed in 1982
Buildings and structures in Leer (district)